Margaretha "Greta" Kuckhoff ( Lorke; 14 December 1902 – 11 November 1981) was a Resistance member in Nazi Germany, who belonged to the illegal Communist Party of Germany and the NKVD spy ring that was dubbed the Red Orchestra by the Abwehr. She was married to Adam Kuckhoff, who was executed by the Third Reich. After the war, she lived in the German Democratic Republic, where she was president of Deutsche Notenbank from 1950 to 1958.

Life
Kuckhoff was born Margaretha Lorke in Frankfurt on the Oder into a poor Catholic family. Her father was a carpenter and built musical instruments; her mother was a seamstress. She later wrote warmly about her childhood; she attended Kleist School, wrote poems for the archbishop and attended the Lyzeum and Oberlyzeum in her hometown.

Education
After training to be a teacher, in 1924, Kuckhoff began to study sociology and economics at Humboldt University in Berlin and at the University of Würzburg. From 1927 to 1929, she studied abroad in the United States at the University of Wisconsin, Madison, where, at the "Friday Niters Club", Friday evening gatherings organized by John R. Commons, she met Mildred and Arvid Harnack. While in Madison, she became an honorary fellow of the sociology department. She graduated in 1929.

Between 1930 and 1932, she lived in Zurich, Switzerland, working for R. Rosendorf, a lawyer  and as a language teacher and freelance translator in the area of business law. Returning to Germany, she became Karl Mannheim's secretary at the Institut für Sozialforschung in Frankfurt am Main. In 1933, she studied briefly at the London School of Economics and made arrangements in preparation for Mannheim's escape from Germany.

In 1933, she met the writer Adam Kuckhoff. They were married on 28 August 1937. Their son, Ule, was born on 8 January 1938.

Resistance
Her first involvement in opposition activities was during this period, when she and her husband decided to work against the Third Reich. They got back in touch with the Harnacks and became involved with Harro and Libertas Schulze-Boysen and the Red Orchestra. In acts of civil disobedience working to convince others to oppose the Nazis, Kuckhoff held lectures and wrote articles analyzing politics and the economy. Within her sphere, she had contact with other Resistance groups, including the Herbert Baum group, who were Jewish; the Bonheffer brothers, Dietrich and Klaus; and the White Rose, whom she knew through Arvid Harnack's brother Falk. Also through Harnack, she met Hans von Dohnanyi from the Kreisau Circle. She was also friendly with others in her own group, such as Adolf Grimme.

In 1935, she joined the Communist Party of Germany (Kommunistische Partei Deutschlands, or KPD). In fact she joined the KPD/SED after World War II and her move to east Berlin to facilitate a life in the nascent GDR. Party politics and the re-writing of history to fit the lore dictated by Moscow made officials pre-date her party membership to 1935.

Through a professional contact, she began working freelance for the Reich Ministry of Public Enlightenment and Propaganda, translating Nazi Party congress speeches and articles about Nazi racial policy. In 1939, she worked for James Vincent Murphy on the English translation of Hitler's Mein Kampf, hoping the translation would educate the British public about Hitler.

The Red Orchestra's activities were discovered in 1942 and arrests began on 30 July. In the following weeks, the organization was crushed as dozens of people were arrested. Kuckhoff was arrested by the Gestapo at her apartment on 12 September 1942; her husband in Prague on the same day. On 3 February 1943, she was sentenced to death as an "accomplice to high treason and [for] failure to report a case of espionage". Her sentence was lifted on 4 May. A few months later, however, in a second trial on 27 September 1943, her civil rights were revoked for "abetting the progress of an organization of high treason and encouraging the enemy". She was sentenced to 10 years in a labor prison and served her sentence first at the women's Zuchthaus in Cottbus; on 4 February 1945 she was sent to Waldheim Zuchthaus, where she was liberated by the Red Army on 8 May 1945. Her husband was executed at Plötzensee Prison; she learned of his death from the prison chaplain.

After World War II 

In 1945, Greta Kuckhoff re-joined the KPD and in May 1945, was appointed the leader of the postwar reconstruction Bureau of Denazified and Abandoned Factories (Amtsstelle für die entnazifizierten und herrenlosen Betriebe) in Berlin. In April 1946, she became a member of the Socialist Unity Party (Sozialistische Einheitspartei Deutschlands, or SED) when the KPD leadership forced a merger with the East German Social Democrats.

She,

Adolf Grimme and Günther Weisenborn attempted to gain legal redress against the former Nazi judge who had convicted them all, Manfred Roeder. After years of delays by the Lüneburg state's attorney, the case was dropped at the end of the 1960s.

Beginning in 1946, Kuckhoff worked in business and government within the German Democratic Republic (GDR), working within the SED and organizations. From 1949 to 1958, she was a representative in the provincial Volkskammer; from 1950 to 1958, she was the president of the central bank that preceded the GDR's Staatsbank. In 1958, she had a disagreement within the SED and was forced out of the bank, though officially, she stepped down for her health. In 1964, she became vice president of the Council and a member of the World Peace Council. In 1972, she published her memoirs under the title, Vom Rosenkranz zur Roten Kapelle.

Kuckhoff died in Wandlitz, aged 78. Her ashes are buried at the Memorial to the Socialists.

Legacy 
There are streets in Berlin, Leipzig, Aachen and Lützen named Kuckhoffstraße, after Greta and Adam Kuckhoff. The installation of a stolperstein for Greta Kuckhoff in Frankfurt on the Oder is planned for 5 May 2012.

Awards and honors 
 1955 Clara Zetkin Prize
 1955 Patriotic Order of Merit in silver
 1958 Medal for Fighters against Fascism
 1965 Patriotic Order of Merit in gold
 1967 Honorary citizen, City of Frankfurt (Oder)
 1968 Carl von Ossietzky Prize of the 
 1972 Star of People's Friendship in gold
 1973 Honorary doctorate from Martin Luther University of Halle-Wittenberg
 1977 Thomasius Plaque from Martin Luther University of Halle-Wittenberg
 1980 Karl Marx Order

Literature 
 Rote Kapelle. In: Aufbau, Aufbau-Verlag, East Berlin 1948, Heft 1, pp. 30–37

Sources

Footnotes

References

External links 
 
 Short biography of Greta Kuckhoff, German Resistance Memorial Center
 Biography My History-Blog. Retrieved January 29, 2012 

1902 births
1981 deaths
People from Frankfurt (Oder)
People from the Province of Brandenburg
Communist Party of Germany politicians
Socialist Unity Party of Germany politicians
Members of the Provisional Volkskammer
Members of the 2nd Volkskammer
Union of Persecutees of the Nazi Regime members
Communists in the German Resistance
Red Orchestra (espionage)
People condemned by Nazi courts
Humboldt University of Berlin alumni
Martin Luther University of Halle-Wittenberg alumni
Recipients of the Patriotic Order of Merit (honor clasp)